Héctor Ramón Zelaya Rivera (born 12 August 1958) is a retired Honduran football player.

Club career
Nicknamed Pecho de Águila (Eagle chest), he started as a forward but later played in defense or midfield for F.C. Motagua. He made his professional debut in the Honduran Liga Nacional on 7 March 1976 wearing the Motagua jersey in the 1–0 win against Campamento.

Not to be confused with former Motagua teammate Héctor "Lin" Zelaya, Zelaya also played for Spanish Segunda División side Deportivo de La Coruña but an injury to his left knee prevented him from making an impact and he had to retire in 1983. He played his final game for Motagua against Universidad, aged only 24.

International career
Zelaya played three games for the Honduras U-20's at the 1977 FIFA U-20 World Cup in Tunisia.

He then played in 7 World Cup qualifying matches in 1980 and 1981, taking Honduras to their first ever World Cup. He made history by scoring his country's first ever goal at a World Cup Finals Tournament, when he scored against hosts Spain at the 1982 FIFA World Cup. He put Honduras 1–0 up in Valencia before Spain scored the equalizer.

Retirement
After his playing career came to a premature end, he worked 25 years in the coffee business of his wife's family. Also, he has been working for a children's football programme in Honduras called Fútbol para la vida.

Personal life
Zelaya is married to journalist Marlen Perdomo and they have 4 children: Héctor, Iving, Alejandra and Marlen.

Honours and awards

Club
C.D. Motagua
Liga Profesional de Honduras (1):  1978–79

References

External links
 El gol más "bonito" del mundo- La Tribuna 
 Un día muy especial - ESPN 
 Biografía Héctor Zelaya

1958 births
Living people
People from Santa Bárbara Department, Honduras
Association football defenders
Honduran footballers
Honduras international footballers
1982 FIFA World Cup players
F.C. Motagua players
Deportivo de La Coruña players
Liga Nacional de Fútbol Profesional de Honduras players
Honduran expatriate footballers
Expatriate footballers in Spain
Honduran expatriate sportspeople in Spain
Segunda División players